Pushkin Is Our Everything is a 2014 American documentary film directed, written, and produced by Michael Beckelhimer.  The film is about life and times of the 19th-century Russian poet Aleksandr Pushkin and his lasting influence and legacy on 200 years of Russian history. The name of the film is a set expression in Russian.

References

External links
 
 

2014 films
2014 documentary films
2014 independent films
American documentary films
American independent films
Films shot in Russia
Films shot in Moscow
Documentary films about poets
Alexander Pushkin
2010s English-language films
2010s American films